Willie Davis Belton (December 12, 1948 – December 7, 1992) was an American football running back in the National Football League who played for the Atlanta Falcons and St. Louis Cardinals. He played college football for the Maryland Eastern Shore Hawks.

References

1948 births
1992 deaths
American football running backs
Atlanta Falcons players
St. Louis Cardinals (football) players
Maryland Eastern Shore Hawks football players